Best... I is a compilation album by the Smiths. It was released in August 1992 by the new owner of their back catalogue, WEA (Sire Records in the United States). Its highest British chart position was #1; it reached No. 139 on the U.S. charts. Warner UK used a photograph taken by actor Dennis Hopper titled "Biker Couple, 1961" (top photo) for the artwork of the two 1992 "Best of" compilations by The Smiths.

Background
WEA (now the Warner Music Group) had acquired the entire Smiths back catalogue in early 1992. Along with the re-release of all original albums and compilations, they immediately set to work compiling a 'best of' collection in two volumes. It was the first time a regular best of compilation had ever been made of The Smiths' material and the album effortlessly reached the top of the British charts. The British press had doubts about sell-out and low track selection coherence.

The material is more or less picked and sequenced at random, and consists of both singles and album cuts. It was followed later the same year by its sibling, ...Best II. The first spin-off single, a re-release of "This Charming Man", reached No. 8 in the singles chart, the highest position a Smiths single had ever reached. A second single promoting Best... I, an edited re-release of "How Soon Is Now?", got to No. 16 (the uncut version is featured on the compilation).

Cover
The UK and European release of the record featured the left half of a biker couple photograph by Dennis Hopper from 1961 entitled 'Biker Couple' on its sleeve, with ...Best II completing the picture; the U.S. sleeve was designed by singer Morrissey and features Richard Davalos, co-star of East of Eden.

Track listing
All tracks written by Morrissey and Johnny Marr.

"This Charming Man" (Single A-side) – 2:43
"William, It Was Really Nothing" (Single A-side) – 2:09
"What Difference Does It Make?" (album version) (Single A-side) – 3:51
"Stop Me If You Think You've Heard This One Before" (Single A-side) – 3:34
"Girlfriend in a Coma" (Single A-side) – 2:02
"Half a Person" (B-side of "Shoplifters of the World Unite") – 3:36
"Rubber Ring" (B-side of "The Boy with the Thorn in His Side") – 3:48
"How Soon Is Now?" (full version) (Single A-side) – 6:46
"Hand in Glove" (album version) (Single A-side) – 3:25
"Shoplifters of the World Unite" (Single A-side) – 2:58
"Sheila Take a Bow" (Single A-side) – 2:42
"Some Girls Are Bigger Than Others" (From The Queen Is Dead) – 3:18
"Panic" (Single A-side) – 2:20
"Please, Please, Please, Let Me Get What I Want" (B-side of "William, It Was Really Nothing") – 1:54

Charts

Personnel
 Morrissey – vocals
 Johnny Marr – guitars, harmonica, mandolins on "Please, Please, Please Let Me Get What I Want"
 Andy Rourke – bass guitar
 Mike Joyce – drums
 Craig Gannon – rhythm guitar on "Half a Person" and "Panic"

Additional musicians

 John Porter – slide guitar on "Sheila Take a Bow"
 Stephen Street – synthesized string arrangements on "Girlfriend in a Coma".

Production

 John Porter – producer (A1-A3, B1, B6-B7)
 Johnny Marr, Morrissey and Street – producers (A4-A6, B4)
 Morrissey and Marr – producers (A7, B5)
 The Smiths – producers (B2)
 Johnny Marr – producer (B3)

Certifications and sales

|}

References

The Smiths compilation albums
1992 greatest hits albums
Warner Music Group compilation albums
Albums produced by Stephen Street
Albums produced by John Porter (musician)